Ocean Spray may refer to:

 Sea spray, aerosol particles formed from the ocean
 Ocean Spray (cooperative), a group of fruit growers
 "Ocean Spray" (song), by the Manic Street Preachers
 Ocean Spray Hotel, Miami Beach, Miami-Dade, Florida, USA; a historic hotel
 Holodiscus discolor, a type of flowering shrub

See also

 Ocean (disambiguation)
 Spray (disambiguation)
 
 
 
 Seaspray (disambiguation)